70 Million Steps Against Coups (Turkish: Darbeye Karşı 70 Milyon Adım) were a series of rallies that took place in Turkey in support of the Anti-militarism against Republic Protests. Trade unions and non-governmental organizations attended the protests. The first rally took place in İstanbul on 21 July 2008.

References

External links
Official website

2008 protests
Turkish democracy movements
Protests in Turkey
2008 in Turkey
2000s in Istanbul